The South African War Memorial, also known as the Boer War Memorial, is a war memorial in Cardiff, Wales. It was erected in 1908 and unveiled by General Sir John French on 20 November 1909 to honour the victims of the Second Boer War. It is a Grade II* listed structure.

Design
The memorial was sculpted by the English sculptor, Albert Toft. It lies at the south end of Edward VII Avenue, between the Cardiff Crown Court and City Hall in Cathays Park and is the centre of a U bend in the cul-de-sac. 

The memorial consists of a bronze winged figure of peace holding an uprooted olive tree and standing on an orb, mounted on Portland Stone plinth with granite steps. On each corner stands metal lampstands with glass globe. It has two figures, a seated male figure (representing war and courage), on the western side (left of the main inscription), holding a sword & leaning on a shield. A seated female figure (representing grief) on the eastern side (right of the main inscription), holding a wreath and also leaning on a shield. The memorial is dedicated to "Welshmen" who served in a variety of units during the war.

Inscriptions

See also
Welsh National War Memorial
South African War Memorial for other Boer War memorials

Notes

External links
 

1908 sculptures
Sculptures by Albert Toft
Grade II* listed monuments and memorials in Wales
Grade II* listed buildings in Cardiff
British military memorials and cemeteries
Second Boer War memorials
War memorials in Cardiff
Cathays Park
Statues in Cardiff